Yanomamö (Yąnomamɨ) is the most populous of several closely related languages spoken by the Yanomami people. Most speakers are monolingual. It has no natively-used writing system. For a grammatical description, see Yanomaman languages.

Phonology 

/ɾ/ can also alternate to a lateral approximant [l] sound. A glottal stop sound [ʔ] can be heard intervocalically.

References 

Yanomaman languages
Subject–object–verb languages
Languages of Venezuela
Languages of Brazil